Nathan Burke (born 6 February 1970) is a former Australian rules footballer and current coach of the  team in the AFL Women's competition (AFLW). 

A tough rover he is considered the most courageous footballers to play for the St Kilda Football Club. He set the club record for most games at his retirement, with 323 games which was broken by former team-mate Robert Harvey in round 7, 2006. Dozens of concussions during his career led to him using a helmet. In 2021 he was inducted into the Australian Football Hall of Fame.

VFL/AFL playing career
Burke was co-captain in St Kilda's 1996 AFL Ansett Australia Cup winning side – the club's first AFL Cup win.

He started his football playing career with the Pines Football Club. His professional career spanned 1987–2003 despite missing most of 2002 with a knee injury, with Burke deciding to retire late in the season, in the Round 19 clash with Richmond, which the Saints won by 80 points. It was also notable for the fact that the coaching panel of Richmond that day included fellow St Kilda teammates Danny Frawley and Stewart Loewe, who stayed on the ground in honour of Burke following his parade lap (with Alex Lloyd's "Amazing" played at the ground).

Post-playing career
Burke had been a director of the St Kilda Football Club from 2008 to 2015. He had joined the board with fellow player Andrew Thompson.

He is also a regular expert commentator on ABC Grandstand football coverage, an AFL analyst for Fox Sports News, and co hosts the Sunday Session on ABC radio. He is a feature article writer for Inside Football magazine also. This work complements his corporate guest speaking and school programs.

In 2015 he rejoined the AFL Match Review Panel, a role he held prior to joining the Board at St Kilda.

In September 2019, Burke was due to become assistant coach in the AFL Women's with St Kilda, but was instead appointed by the Western Bulldogs to their head coach role from the 2020 AFL Women's season.

Personal life
Burke's uncle Nick Bloom also played for St Kilda.

Playing statistics

|- style="background-color: #EAEAEA"
! scope="row" style="text-align:center" | 1987
|style="text-align:center;"|
| 48 || 16 || 2 || 0 || 179 || 96 || 275 || 40 || 33 || 0.1 || 0.0 || 11.2 || 6.0 || 17.2 || 2.5 || 2.1
|-
! scope="row" style="text-align:center" | 1988
|style="text-align:center;"|
| 29 || 22 || 6 || 8 || 321 || 121 || 442 || 70 || 38 || 0.3 || 0.4 || 14.6 || 5.5 || 20.1 || 3.2 || 1.7
|- style="background-color: #EAEAEA"
! scope="row" style="text-align:center" | 1989
|style="text-align:center;"|
| 29 || 21 || 12 || 4 || 265 || 143 || 408 || 66 || 38 || 0.6 || 0.2 || 12.6 || 6.8 || 19.4 || 3.1 || 1.8
|-
! scope="row" style="text-align:center" | 1990
|style="text-align:center;"|
| 29 || 14 || 2 || 1 || 133 || 110 || 243 || 32 || 27 || 0.1 || 0.1 || 9.5 || 7.9 || 17.4 || 2.3 || 1.9
|- style="background-color: #EAEAEA"
! scope="row" style="text-align:center" | 1991
|style="text-align:center;"|
| 29 || 23 || 3 || 1 || 316 || 180 || 496 || 64 || 53 || 0.1 || 0.0 || 13.7 || 7.8 || 21.6 || 2.8 || 2.3
|-
! scope="row" style="text-align:center" | 1992
|style="text-align:center;"|
| 3 || 24 || 9 || 6 || 296 || 158 || 454 || 64 || 69 || 0.4 || 0.3 || 12.3 || 6.6 || 18.9 || 2.7 || 2.9
|- style="background-color: #EAEAEA"
! scope="row" style="text-align:center" | 1993
|style="text-align:center;"|
| 3 || 20 || 9 || 7 || 322 || 148 || 470 || 68 || 72 || 0.5 || 0.4 || 16.1 || 7.4 || 23.5 || 3.4 || 3.6
|-
! scope="row" style="text-align:center" | 1994
|style="text-align:center;"|
| 3 || 22 || 7 || 3 || 335 || 173 || 508 || 84 || 77 || 0.3 || 0.1 || 15.2 || 7.9 || 23.1 || 3.8 || 3.5
|- style="background-color: #EAEAEA"
! scope="row" style="text-align:center" | 1995
|style="text-align:center;"|
| 3 || 18 || 9 || 7 || 318 || 122 || 440 || 75 || 49 || 0.5 || 0.4 || 17.7 || 6.8 || 24.4 || 4.2 || 2.7
|-
! scope="row" style="text-align:center" | 1996
|style="text-align:center;"|
| 3 || 22 || 15 || 9 || 434 || 146 || 580 || 92 || 64 || 0.7 || 0.4 || 19.7 || 6.6 || 26.4 || 4.2 || 2.9
|- style="background-color: #EAEAEA"
! scope="row" style="text-align:center" | 1997
|style="text-align:center;"|
| 3 || 25 || 9 || 14 || 469 || 200 || 669 || 99 || 75 || 0.4 || 0.6 || 18.8 || 8.0 || 26.8 || 4.0 || 3.0
|-
! scope="row" style="text-align:center" | 1998
|style="text-align:center;"|
| 3 || 22 || 10 || 12 || 343 || 187 || 530 || 81 || 75 || 0.5 || 0.5 || 15.6 || 8.5 || 24.1 || 3.7 || 3.4
|- style="background-color: #EAEAEA"
! scope="row" style="text-align:center" | 1999
|style="text-align:center;"|
| 3 || 21 || 4 || 1 || 299 || 157 || 456 || 96 || 49 || 0.2 || 0.0 || 14.2 || 7.5 || 21.7 || 4.6 || 2.3
|-
! scope="row" style="text-align:center" | 2000
|style="text-align:center;"|
| 3 || 22 || 8 || 7 || 363 || 141 || 504 || 92 || 52 || 0.4 || 0.3 || 16.5 || 6.4 || 22.9 || 4.2 || 2.4
|- style="background-color: #EAEAEA"
! scope="row" style="text-align:center" | 2001
|style="text-align:center;"|
| 3 || 10 || 10 || 2 || 127 || 82 || 209 || 28 || 22 || 1.0 || 0.2 || 12.7 || 8.2 || 20.9 || 2.8 || 2.2
|-
! scope="row" style="text-align:center" | 2002
|style="text-align:center;"|
| 3 || 3 || 3 || 0 || 22 || 16 || 38 || 11 || 10 || 1.0 || 0.0 || 7.3 || 5.3 || 12.7 || 3.7 || 3.3
|- style="background-color: #EAEAEA"
! scope="row" style="text-align:center" | 2003
|style="text-align:center;"|
| 3 || 18 || 6 || 10 || 132 || 89 || 221 || 57 || 38 || 0.3 || 0.6 || 7.3 || 4.9 || 12.3 || 3.2 || 2.1
|- class="sortbottom"
! colspan=3| Career
! 323
! 124
! 92
! 4674
! 2269
! 6943
! 1119
! 841
! 0.4
! 0.3
! 14.5
! 7.0
! 21.5
! 3.5
! 2.6
|}

Coaching statistics
Statistics correct to the end of the 2021 season

|- style="background-color: #EAEAEA"
! scope="row" style="font-weight:normal"|2020
|
| 6 || 1 || 5 || 0 || 17% || 6 (conf.) || 7 (conf.)
|-
! scope="row" style="font-weight:normal"|2021
|
| 9 || 5 || 4 || 0 || 56% || 8 || 14
|- class="sortbottom"
! colspan=2| Career totals
! 15
! 6
! 9
! 0
! 40%
! colspan=2|
|}

Honours and achievements

Team
McClelland Trophy (St Kilda): 1997
Pre-Season Cup (St Kilda): 1996
Individual
All-Australian: 1993, 1996, 1997, 1999
Herald Sun Player of the Year Award: 1996
Trevor Barker Award (St Kilda F.C. Best & Fairest): 1993, 1996, 1999
St Kilda F.C. Captain: 1996-2000
Australian Representative Honours in International Rules Football: 1999
Victorian Representative Honours

References

External links

Trevor Barker Award winners
All-Australians (AFL)
St Kilda Football Club players
Victorian State of Origin players
1970 births
Living people
Australian rules footballers from Victoria (Australia)
Australia international rules football team players